The Book is the debut extended play (EP) and first physical release recorded by Yoasobi. It was released through Sony Music Entertainment Japan on January 6, 2021, the same date with their single "Kaibutsu", accompanied the second season of Beastars, "Encore" serves as a promotional single of the EP. Ayase, a member of the duo, also released the cover version of The Book, on the same day as the EP, titled Mikunoyoasobi, recorded by Hatsune Miku, exclusively at Tower Records Japan.

Commercial performance

The Book debuted at number two on the Oricon Albums Chart, behind SixTones's 1ST, selling 72,238 copies in its first week. and 146,745 copies as of 2021. It topped Oricon Digital Albums Chart for five consecutive weeks and the year-end chart with 100,656 downloads in 2021 alone, becoming the only album to reach this milestone in the year. For Billboard Japan Hot Albums, The Book entered at number two with 74,601 CD copies, and 10,069 download units. The Book received a gold certification for both physical and digital release by Recording Industry Association of Japan (RIAJ). All tracks of the EP except the intro and outro are also certified platinum or higher for streaming by RIAJ.

Accolades

Track listing

Credits and personnel

Credits adapted from the EP liner notes.

 Ayase – songwriter, producer 
 Ikura – vocals 
 Rockwell – guitar 
 AssH – guitar 
 Takeruru – guitar 
 Plusonica – chorus 
 Takayuki Saitō – vocal recording 
 Masahiko Fukui – mixing

Charts

Weekly charts

Monthly charts

Year-end charts

Certifications and sales

Release history

References

2021 debut EPs
2021 EPs
Japanese-language EPs
Sony Music Entertainment Japan EPs
Yoasobi EPs